The Żórawina radio transmitter is a facility for FM (and previously MW) transmission at Żórawina, south of Wrocław. It was established in 1932 as "Reichssender Breslau" and used as an antenna tower. Originally it was a 140-metre-tall free-standing lattice tower built of wood, on which a wire antenna was hung up. On the top of the tower there was an octagonal ring of bronze with a diameter of 10.6 metres for electrical lengthening of the antenna.

In 1940 a second transmission aerial was built. It was an arrangement of three T-antennas mounted on three 49.9-metre-tall guyed masts, which formed a triangle with equal side length. This antenna and the wood tower were in use until the shutdown of the facility on February 7, 1945.

After 1945 transmission was resumed by the Polish Broadcasting Company using the wood tower as an antenna tower. The frequency of the transmitter was changed to 1206 kHz in 1965. In 1976 a 260-metre-tall mast radiator was built at the site, with the radiated power increased to 200 kilowatts after its completion. The wood tower remained as a backup antenna until its demolition in fall 1990. Until its own demolition, the tower was the tallest wooden structure on earth after the demolition of the wooden radio tower of Transmitter Ismaning on March 16, 1983.

In 1997 the MW transmitter was shut down. The guys of the mast, which were divided by insulators, were replaced with guys without insulators as the mast is now only used for FM- and TV-transmissions.

Transmitted programmes

TV programmes

FM radio programmes

See also
List of masts
List of towers

External links
 http://www.emitel.pl/obiekty/wroclawzorawina.html
 http://www.ukf.pl/index.php/topic,52.0.html
 http://www.skyscraperpage.com/diagrams/?b47072
 http://www.skyscraperpage.com/diagrams/?b60101
 http://skps.wroclaw.pl/wieczorynki/wiecz09.php
 http://radiopolska.pl/wykaz/pokaz_lokalizacja.php?pid=138
 picture from communist era, showing the actual mast and the former wooden tower

Radio masts and towers in Poland
Buildings and structures in Lower Silesian Voivodeship
Wrocław County
Towers completed in 1932
1932 establishments in Poland